Villers-Semeuse is a commune in the Ardennes department in northern France.

Population

Notable people
This is a list of people of interest who were born or lived in Villers Semeuse:
 Jean-Pierre Brunois, entrepreneur
 Roger Marche, footballer

See also
Communes of the Ardennes department

References

Communes of Ardennes (department)
Ardennes communes articles needing translation from French Wikipedia